O.K. is the second album by Gabrielle Smith, released under the moniker Eskimeaux, now known as Gabby's World. Many of the songs first appeared on Igluenza, a collection of demos. The sound and feel of the album is described as dreamy, encouraging and hazy.
The album is inspired by Xiu Xiu, Gowns, Mount Eerie, Tegan and Sara and Taylor Swift.

Track listing

Personnel
 Colin Alexander – Artwork, Design
 Susannah Cutler – Artwork
 Eskimeaux – Primary Artist
 Jack Greenleaf – Producer, Synthesizer
 Andrew Piccone – Photography
 Power Animal – Lyricist
 Gabrielle Smith – Composer,  Lyricist
 Oliver Kalb - Vocals, Synthesizer
 Felix Walworth – Drums
 Nick Corbo - Guitar
 Mitski – vocals

References

2015 albums